The brown-throated sunbird (Anthreptes malacensis), also known as the plain-throated sunbird, is a species of bird in the family Nectariniidae. It is found in a wide range of semi-open habitats in south-east Asia, ranging from Myanmar to the Lesser Sundas and west Philippines. The grey-throated sunbird found in the remaining part of the Philippines is often considered a subspecies of the brown-throated sunbird, but the two differ consistently in measurements and plumage, and there is no evidence of intergradation between them.

Taxonomy 
The following subspecies are recognised:

 A. m. malacensis (Scopoli, 1786) – mainland Southeast Asia, Sumatra and satellite islands, most of Borneo aside from the north, Java and Bali
 A. m. anambae Oberholser, 1917 – Anambas Islands
 A. m. erixanthus Oberholser, 1932 – Natuna Islands
 A. m. bornensis Riley, 1920 – north Borneo
 A. m. mjobergi Bangs & Peters, JL, 1927 – Maratua
 A. m. paraguae Riley, 1920 – Palawan
 A. m. heliolusius Oberholser, 1923 – Mindanao
 A. m. wiglesworthi Hartert, 1902 – Sulu Archipelago
 A. m. iris Parkes, 1971 – Sibutu Islands
 A. m. chlorigaster Sharpe, 1877 – Western Visayas
 A. m. cagayanensis Mearns, 1905 – Mapun
 A. m. heliocalus Oberholser, 1923 – Sangihe and Siau
 A. m. celebensis Shelley, 1878 – Sulawesi and satellite islands
 A. m. extremus Mees, 1966 – Banggai and Sula 
 A. m. convergens Rensch, 1929 – Lombok to Alor
 A. m. rubrigena Rensch, 1931 – Sumba

Description
The brown-throated sunbird is a relatively large, heavy sunbird with a thick bill.

Like most sunbirds, the male brown-throated sunbird is more colourful than the female. The male has iridescent green and purple upperparts with chestnut on the wing-coverts and scapulars; it is primarily yellow below. The female is olive-green above and yellowish below.

Behaviour
The brown-throated sunbird primarily feeds on nectar, but it will also take small fruits and berries. Juveniles are fed with insects.

Gallery

References

 Cheke, Robert A., Mann, Clive F., & Allen, Richard. (2001). Sunbirds: A Guide to the Sunbirds, Flowerpeckers, Spiderhunters and Sugarbirds of the World. Christopher Helm, London. pp. 184–186.

brown-throated sunbird
Birds of Southeast Asia
brown-throated sunbird
Taxonomy articles created by Polbot